The Dover transmitting station is a facility for broadcasting and telecommunications, located at West Hougham, near Dover, Kent. The station is owned by Arqiva. The recommended UHF aerial group is C/D with horizontal polarisation.

There is also a relay transmitter located in the town of Dover (Dover Town); in addition FM radio services are covered by the Swingate transmitting station.

Along with Heathfield and Bluebell Hill, Dover transmits regional television services from BBC One South East and ITV Meridian (South East).

Channels listed by frequency

Analogue radio (FM VHF)

Digital radio (DAB)

Digital television

Before switchover 

† Transmitted from Dover B.

Analogue television 
Analogue television transmissions have now ceased. BBC Two was closed on 13 June 2012, with BBC One being temporarily moved into its place, followed by the remaining three services on 27 June.

See also
List of masts
List of tallest buildings and structures in Great Britain

References

External links
 The Transmission Gallery: Dover Transmitter photographs and information
 The Transmission Gallery: Television coverage map
 Dover Transmitter at thebigtower.com

Buildings and structures in Kent
Port of Dover, Kent
Transmitter sites in England